In Japan! is a live album by Buck Owens and his Buckaroos, released in 1967.

Reception

In his Allmusic review, critic Cub Koda called the album "Long one of the finer efforts in the Buck Owens album catalog and also one of the finest live country records of all time, In Japan! shines... Although his Live at Carnegie Hall album is considered by most fans as definitive, here's another one that shouldn't be dismissed for a second."

Track listing
All songs by Buck Owens unless otherwise noted.
 "Opening Remarks by Tetsuo Otsuka" 
 "Adios, Farewell, Goodbye, Good Luck, So Long"
 "I Was Born to Be in Love With You"
 "Open Up Your Heart"
 "Second Fiddle"
 "Fiddle Polka" (Don Rich)
 "Fishin' on the Mississippi" (Bob Morris)
 "Way That I Love You"
 "Tokyo Polka" (Owens, Willie Cantu)
 "Where Does the Good Times Go"
 "Steel Guitar Polka" (Tom Brumley, Owens)
 "Don't Wipe the Tears That You Cry for Him on My Good White Shirt" (Morris)
 "Drum So-Low" (Cantu)
 "Roll Out the Red Carpet"
 "We Were Made for Each Other"

Charts

Personnel
Buck Owens – vocals, guitar
Don Rich – guitar, fiddle, vocals
Tom Brumley – pedal steel guitar
Wayne Wilson – bass, vocals
Willie Cantu – drums

References

External links
Reissue review at No Depression magazine.

Buck Owens albums
1967 live albums
Capitol Records live albums
Albums produced by Ken Nelson (United States record producer)